Mawson Peninsula is a high, narrow, ice-covered peninsula on the George V Coast, on the west side of the Slava Ice Shelf, Antarctica, terminating in Cape Hudson. The peninsula was photographed from the air by U.S. Navy Operation Highjump, 1946–47, and was sketched and photographed by Phillip Law of the Australian National Antarctic Research Expeditions who flew along it to its northern end in February 1959. It was named by the Antarctic Names Committee of Australia for Sir Douglas Mawson.

Cape Hudson is the north cape of Mawson Peninsula. Land was sighted in this area on January 19, 1840, by the crew of Lt. William L. Hudson's USS Peacock during the United States Exploring Expedition (1838–42) under Charles Wilkes, who applied the name Cape Hudson. An analysis by B.P. Lambert and P.G. Law of the USEE chart, and of the photographs taken by USN Operation Highjump (1946–47) and ANARE (Australian National Antarctic Research Expeditions) (1959), suggests that the north cape of Mawson Peninsula is Wilkes' Cape Hudson.

Further reading 
 United States. Defense Mapping Agency. Hydrographic Center, Sailing Directions for Antarctica: Includes Islands South of Latitude 60°, P 267

External links 

 Mawson Peninsula on USGS website
 Mawson Peninsula on AADC website
 Mawson Peninsula on SCAR website
 Mawson Peninsula area map
 Mawson Peninsula on marineregions
 Mawson Peninsula on peakbagger

References 

Peninsulas of Antarctica
Landforms of George V Land
Landforms of Oates Land